Arzgun is a rural locality (an ulus) in Kurumkansky District, Republic of Buryatia, Russia. The population was 796 as of 2010. There are 16 streets.

Geography 
Arzgun is located 51 km east of Kurumkan (the district's administrative centre) by road. Zaimka Amatkhan is the nearest rural locality.

References 

Rural localities in Kurumkansky District